Kari Virtanen (born 15 September 1958) is a Finnish football manager and former player. He is currently coach of Veikkausliiga club Inter Turku.

Club career

As a player Virtanen spent his career in Finland and Sweden, representing Piikkiön Palloseura, TPS, IFK Eskilstuna, AIK, Rovaniemen Palloseura, Kemin Palloseura and Kuusankosken Kumu.

International career

Virtanen represented Team Finland in the 1980 Summer Olympic Games in Moscow, Soviet Union. Finland finished 3rd in Group D with one win, one draw and one loss. Virtanen was in starting eleven in all three matches.

Managerial career

As a manager Virtanen has been working with teams in different tiers of Finnish football league system. His first manager position in Veikkausliiga was in 2003 with Inter Turku. He has been a manager of Rovaniemen Palloseura on two occasions. In 2012 he won Ykkönen with RoPS and promoted to Veikkausliiga. In the following season RoPS also won Finnish Cup for the second time in their history.

In 2016 he was named as a co-manager of IFK Mariehamn with Peter Lundberg. IFK Mariehamn won Veikkausliiga for the first time in history that season. Virtanen remained in the club as an advisor for one more season.

Honours and achievements

Player
AIK Fotboll
Svenska Cupen: 1985

Rovaniemen Palloseura
Finnish Cup: 1986

Manager
Rovaniemen Palloseura
Ykkönen: 2012
Finnish Cup: 2013

IFK Mariehamn
Veikkausliiga: 2016

Individual
 Veikkausliiga Manager of the Month: April 2016, October 2016 (with Peter Lundberg)
 Veikkausliiga Manager of the Year: 2016 (with Peter Lundberg)
 Finnish Football Manager of the Year: 2016 (with Peter Lundberg)

References

Living people
1958 births
Finnish footballers
Turun Palloseura footballers
Rovaniemen Palloseura players
Finnish expatriate footballers
Expatriate footballers in Sweden
Allsvenskan players
AIK Fotboll players
Finland international footballers
Finland under-21 international footballers
Olympic footballers of Finland
Footballers at the 1980 Summer Olympics
Finnish football managers
FC Inter Turku managers
Rovaniemen Palloseura managers
IFK Mariehamn managers
Association football midfielders